The 2018 Qatar Cup, more widely known as the Crown Prince Cup, was the twenty-fourth edition of the Qatar Cup. It was played from April 21–27. The cup is contested by the top four finishers of the 2017–18 Qatar Stars League.

Participants
The top four teams of the 2017–18 Qatar Stars League qualified for the tournament.

Matches

Semi-finals

Finals

Bracket

Top scorers

References

Qatar Crown Prince Cup
Qatar Cup
Qatar Cup